Albigence Waldo Putnam (born in Marietta, Ohio, 11 March 1799; died in Nashville, Tennessee, 20 January 1869) was a United States lawyer and historian.

Biography
He studied law, practised in Mississippi, and in 1836 settled in Nashville, Tennessee, and was president of the Tennessee Historical Society, to whose publications he was a contributor. In addition to articles in periodicals, he wrote:
 History of Middle Tennessee (Nashville, 1859)
 Life and Times of Gen. James Robertson (1859)
 “Life of Gen. John Sevier,” in Wheeler's History of North Carolina

Notes

References

1799 births
1869 deaths
American historians
People from Nashville, Tennessee
Albigence Waldo